Noah R. Feldman (born May 22, 1970) is an American legal scholar and academic. He is the Felix Frankfurter Professor of Law at Harvard Law School and chairman of the Harvard Society of Fellows. He is the author of 10 books, host of the podcast Deep Background, and a public affairs columnist for Bloomberg Opinion. He was formerly a contributing writer for The New York Times.

Feldman's work is devoted to ethics and constitutional law, with an emphasis on free speech, law and religion, and the history of constitutional ideas.

Early life and education
Feldman grew up in Cambridge, Massachusetts, in an Orthodox Jewish home. Feldman studied Near Eastern languages and civilizations at Harvard University. In 1990, as a junior, he was the Massachusetts recipient of the Harry S. Truman Scholarship. Feldman graduated first in his class in 1992 with an A.B., summa cum laude, and Phi Beta Kappa membership.

Upon graduating from Harvard, Feldman was awarded a Rhodes Scholarship to study at Christ Church, Oxford. In 1994, he earned a Doctor of Philosophy in Oriental Studies (focusing on Aristotle's Ethics and its Islamic reception) in just two years—reportedly the fastest on record. While at Oxford, he was a member of the Oxford University L'Chaim Society. Feldman then returned to the United States to attend Yale Law School, where he was the book review editor of the Yale Law Journal. He graduated with a Juris Doctor in 1997. 

According to Harvard Magazine, Feldman is a "hyperpolyglot." He is fluent in English, Hebrew, Arabic, and French. He also speaks conversational Korean, and read Greek, Latin, German, Italian, Spanish and Aramaic.

Career

Legal career 
After graduating from law school, Feldman was a law clerk for chief judge Harry T. Edwards of the U.S. Court of Appeals for the District of Columbia Circuit from 1997 to 1998, then for justice David Souter of the U.S. Supreme Court from 1998 to 1999.

In 2001, Feldman joined the faculty of New York University Law School, where he became a tenured full professor in 2005 and was appointed Cecilia Goetz Professor of Law in 2006.

In 2007, Feldman joined the Harvard Law School faculty as the Bemis Professor of International Law, teaching classes on the First Amendment, the Constitution, and the international order. In 2014, he was appointed the Felix Frankfurter Professor of Law at Harvard Law School.

Feldman was a senior adjunct fellow at the Council on Foreign Relations, and was previously an adjunct fellow at New America Foundation.

Writer and author 
Feldman has published 9 nonfiction books and 2 case books.

They include The Broken Constitution, Divided By God, What We Owe Iraq, Cool War, Scorpions, The Three Lives of James Madison and The Arab Winter. Reviewing The Arab Winter in The New York Times, Robert F. Worth called Feldman's thesis "bold" and that Feldman "spins out its ramifications in fascinating and persuasive ways." Reviewing The Broken Constitution, James Oakes concludes that Feldman ignores "the voluminous historical evidence that would have added some much-needed nuance to his thoroughly unpersuasive analysis."

He was a contributing writer for The New York Times Magazine from 2005 to 2011.

Since 2012, he has been a regular columnist for Bloomberg Opinion. He also regularly contributes essays to The New York Review of Books about constitutional topics and the Supreme Court.

Podcast host 
Since 2019, Feldman has been the host of the podcast named Deep Background with Noah Feldman, which is produced by Pushkin Industries. Deep Background focuses on the historical, scientific, legal, and cultural context underlying the news, with a focus on power & ethics. He has interviewed Malcolm Gladwell, Laurie R. Santos, and Marc Lipsitch, among others.

Organizations and affiliations 
In 2003 he was named senior constitutional advisor to the Coalition Provisional Authority in Iraq. In that capacity he advised on the drafting of the Transitional Administrative Law, the precursor to the Iraqi constitution.

In 2010, he became a senior fellow at the Harvard Society of Fellows, and in 2020, he was named chair. A Harvard Magazine profile describes the Society as such: "The values it represents to [Feldman] have shaped his career: 'convivial intellectual community with people from many very different backgrounds; interdisciplinary creativity and collaboration; openness to new, unorthodox ideas; pursuing solutions to long-term questions that really matter for the world; generosity to colleagues and across generations; nurturing originality to encourage risk-taking; and belief in sustained, in-person conversation as a central element of the good intellectual life.'"

He is the founding director of the Julis-Rabinowitz Program on Jewish & Israeli Law at Harvard Law School.

Facebook Oversight Board 
Feldman advised Facebook on the creation of its Oversight Board, whose members were announced in June 2020. According to Feldman, the purpose of the Oversight Board is to protect and ensure freedom of expression on the platform by creating an independent body to review Facebook's most important content moderation decisions.

A 2020 profile in Harvard magazine describes the genesis of the board: "On a bike ride one day, [Feldman] thought: Facebook and other social media are under a lot of pressure to avoid outcomes that are morally repugnant. What if they addressed the problem as governments do, giving independent bodies functioning like courts the authority to decide what content is acceptable and what is not? Social media themselves, he decided, should find ways to protect free expression—and he made a proposal to Facebook, the world’s largest social-media platform, with more than 2.6 billion users who send out an average of 115 billion messages a day: 'To put it simply: we need a Supreme Court of Facebook.'"

Trump testimony 
On December 4, 2019, Feldman—alongside law professors Pamela Karlan, Michael Gerhardt, and Jonathan Turley—testified before the House Judiciary Committee regarding the constitutional grounds for presidential impeachment in the impeachment inquiry against President Donald Trump. "Some day, we will no longer be alive, and we will go wherever it is we go, the good place or the other place, and we may meet there Madison and Hamilton," Feldman suggested. "And they will ask us, 'When the president of the United States acted to corrupt the structure of the republic, what did you do?' And our answer to that question must be that we followed the guidance of the framers, and it must be that if the evidence supports that conclusion, that the House of Representatives moves to impeach him."

Public perception

Media 
In 2020, Harvard Magazine wrote of Feldman, a Harvard professor, "Feldman is increasingly prominent as a public intellectual and a voice about public affairs ... His work displays the mix of synthesis and substantive mastery that serious journalists aspire to, and the combination of clarity and eloquence that few scholars display. He writes with the conviction that the most important public position in American life is that of citizen, which makes his fellow citizens the most important audience for his writing about American public affairs."

In 2019, The New York Times published in "Who Is Noah Feldman?" that Feldman was "part of a vanishing breed, a public intellectual equally at ease with writing law review articles, books aimed at both popular and scholarly audiences and regular opinion columns, all leaning left but with a distinct contrarian streak." According to The New York Times, Feldman "specializes in constitutional law and the relationship between law and religion and free speech".

In 2008, Feldman was named in Esquire's list of the "75 most influential people of the 21st century." The magazine called him "one of the country's most sought after authorities," "an acclaimed author" and "a public intellectual of our time."

In 2006, New York Magazine named Feldman "the next big public intellectual," and later, as "most beautiful brainiac" in The Most Beautiful People issue.

In 2005, The New York Observer called Feldman "one of a handful of earnest, platinum-résumé'd law geeks whose prospects for the Big Bench are the source of constant speculation among friends and colleagues".

Criticism of Modern Orthodox Judaism
In a New York Times Magazine article, "Orthodox Paradox", Feldman recounted his experiences of the boundaries of inclusion and exclusion of the Modern Orthodox Jewish community in which he was raised, specifically at his high school alma mater, the Maimonides School. He contended that his choice to marry a non-Jew led to ostracism by the school, in which he and his then-girlfriend were allegedly removed from the 1998 photograph of his class reunion published in the school newsletter. His marriage to a non-Jew is contrary to orthodox Jewish law, although he and his family had been active members of the Harvard Hillel Orthodox minyan. The photographer's account of an over-crowded photograph was used to accuse Feldman of misrepresenting a fundamental fact in the story, namely whether he was purposefully cropped out of the picture, as many other class members were also cropped from the newsletter photograph due to space limitations. His supporters noted that Feldman's claim in the article was that he and his girlfriend were "nowhere to be found" and not that they were cropped or deleted out of the photograph.

His critique of Modern Orthodox Judaism has been commented on by many, including Hillel Halkin, columnist for the New York Sun; Andrew Silow-Carroll, editor of the New Jersey Jewish News; Rabbi Tzvi Hersh Weinreb, executive vice president of the Orthodox Union; Marc B. Shapiro Rabbi Shalom Carmy, tenured professor of Jewish philosophy at Yeshiva University; Rabbi Norman Lamm, chancellor of Yeshiva University; Rabbi Shmuley Boteach; Gary Rosenblatt, editor of Jewish Week, the editorial board of the Jewish Press; Rabbis Ozer Glickman and Aharon Kahn, roshei yeshiva at Yeshiva University; Ami Eden, executive editor of The Forward; Rabbi David M. Feldman, author of Where There's Life, There's Life; and Jonathan Rosenblum, columnist for the Jerusalem Post.

Publications

Books
Feldman has published nine non-fiction books and two casebooks.

 The Broken Constitution: Lincoln, Slavery, and the Refounding of America (2021) “seeks to retell the story of the meaning of the Constitution in the Civil War and of Lincoln’s decisive action not as the story of successful salvation but as something more dramatic, and more extreme: the frank breaking and frank remaking of the entire union of order, rights, constitution, and liberty.” The book is a history of “an extraordinary transformation” in Lincoln's “beliefs about the meaning of the Constitution.”
 The Arab Winter: A Tragedy (2020) seeks to "save the Arab spring from the verdict of implicit nonexistence and to propose an alternative account that highlights the exercise of collective, free political action." The book "is an interdisciplinary work of history and sociology, as well as linguistics, using insights of political philosophy to explore the right ways of governing in the very different countries of Egypt, Syria, and Tunisia, as well as the Islamic State."
 The Three Lives of James Madison: Genius, Partisan, President (2017) "explores Madison's reactive and improvisational thinking as it played out in the three uniquely consequential roles, or ‘lives,' he had — as constitutional architect and co-author with Alexander Hamilton and John Jay of the ‘Federalist Papers,' political partisan and wartime president." Feldman writes that Madison's "character emerges most vividly through the cycles of [his] extraordinarily close friendships" and that his biography is "entwined with that of the constitutional republic itself, its personalities, and its permanent struggle to reconcile unity with profound disagreement."
 Cool War: The Future of Global Competition (2013) is about the relationship between the United States and China, as "the world's two biggest economies are fated to remain geopolitical frenemies, locked in a chilly embrace necessitated by economic interdependence but made tense by constant military and political rivalry in Asia and, increasingly, the rest of the world." As each side vies for supremacy, Feldman warns, the Cool War has the potential to become a hot war.
 Scorpions: The Battles and Triumphs of FDR's Great Supreme Court Justices (2010) focuses on four of Roosevelt's Supreme Court appointees: Felix Frankfurter, Hugo Black, Robert Jackson, and William O. Douglas, and "how the backgrounds, personalities, and experiences of the four justices shaped their philosophies and how those philosophies changed the Court from a conservative one resisting America's liberal turn under FDR into the liberal one that helped remake the nation". This group biography demonstrates that their competing judicial philosophies "are the ones that continue to preoccupy lawyers, law professors and judges".
 The Fall and Rise of the Islamic State (2008) explains the increasingly loud call for implementing shari'a in Muslim countries. Feldman argues that current systems of government in certain Muslim countries have unchecked executive power because the previous system – in which scholarly interpretation of shari'a served to counterbalance executive power – was undermined by failed reforms in the modern era. Drawing on the success of this previous system, Feldman proposes a viable path for Islamic governance that depends on legislators to serve as the check on authoritarian executives.
 Divided By God: America's Church-State Problem and What We Should Do About It  (2005) describes "key episodes in the history of church-state relations to show how the growing religious diversity of the American people has led to new efforts to find common ground for political and social life." Addressing the divide between the competing camps of "values evangelicals" and "legal secularists," Feldman proposes a compromise "to allow religious symbols in public places but not to allow public funding for specifically religious practices or activities".
 What We Owe Iraq: War and the Ethics of Nation Building (2004) argues that "having broken the Iraqi government, Washington has an obligation to bring about a new and better one" while ensuring that nation building does not become "a paternalistic, colonialist charade." As a constitutional advisor to the Coalition Provisional Authority in Iraq, Feldman suggests the United States ensure security and organize elections before withdrawing.
 After Jihad: America and the Struggle for Islamic Democracy (2003) contends that support of violent jihad in the Muslim world is declining in favor of popularity for both Islam and democracy. Explaining shared traits of Islam and democracy, such as equality and flexibility, Feldman argues that the two are in fact compatible and that "democracy in the Arab world should be Islamic in character."

 ——— (2017) The Three Lives of James Madison: Genius, Partisan,  President. Description & arrow/scrollable preview. Random House, New York. .   

 – various editions/supplements prior to this version

Selected articles

Personal life
He is divorced from Jeannie Suk, professor of law at Harvard Law School and New Yorker contributor, with whom he has two children.

See also 
 List of law clerks of the Supreme Court of the United States (Seat 3)

References

External links
 
 
 Profile at Harvard Law School
 
 

1970 births
Living people
Jewish American academics
American political writers
American male non-fiction writers
American Rhodes Scholars
New York University School of Law faculty
Harvard Law School faculty
Yale Law School alumni
Maimonides School alumni
Writers from Boston
Harvard College alumni
Law clerks of the Supreme Court of the United States
Alumni of Christ Church, Oxford
Carnegie Council for Ethics in International Affairs
First Amendment scholars
21st-century American Jews